is a city located in southern Okayama Prefecture, Japan.  {As of|2022|10|31}}, the city had an estimated population of 55,889 in 27087 households, and a population density of 540 persons per km² .  Its total area is

Geography
Tamano is located in southern  Okayama Prefecture. It faces the Seto Inland Sea to the south, and parts of the city are within the borders of the Setonaikai National Park.

Adjoining municipalities
Okayama Prefecture
Okayama
Kurashiki

Climate
Tamano has a humid subtropical climate (Köppen climate classification Cfa).

Demographics
Per Japanese census data, the population of Tamano in 2020 is 56,531 people. Tamano has been conducting censuses since 1920.

History 
The Tamano area is part of ancient Bizen Province. During the Edo Period, it was part of the holdings of Okayama Domain. Following the Meiji restoration, the area was organized into villages within Kojima District, Okayama with the creation of the modern municipalities system on April 1, 1889. The city of Tamano was officially founded on August 3, 1940 by the merger of the towns of Uno and Hibi.

Government
Tamano has a mayor-council form of government with a directly elected mayor and a unicameral city council of 19 members. Tamano contributes two members to the Okayama Prefectural Assembly. In terms of national politics, the city is part of the Okayama 2nd district of the lower house of the Diet of Japan.

Economy
Tamano has a mixed economy of heavy industry, commercial fishing and agriculture. Shipbuilding and metal refining are major industries, with one of the largest shipbuilding yards in Japan, operated by Mitsui Engineering & Shipbuilding, is located in Tamano. Other industries include textiles, chemicals, oil refining and salt production.

Education
Tamano has 14 public elementary schools,  seven public junior high schools and two public high schools operated by the city government, and two public high schools operated by the Okayama prefectural Board of Education.

Transportation 
The JR Uno Line connects it to Okayama. Before the Great Seto Bridge was opened, there was a train ferry between Uno Port in Tamano and Takamatsu on Shikoku. Then, Tamano was the major entrance to Shikoku. Today there still exist many ferry lines between Uno port and Takamatsu, and also the islands of Shōdoshima and Naoshima.

Railway 
 JR West (JR West) - Uno Line
  -  -  -

Highways

Sister city relations
 - Tongyeong, South Gyeongsang, Republic of Korea since August 3, 1981 
 - Jiujiang,  Jiangxi , China, friendship city since 1996 
 - Gloucester, Massachusetts, United States,  since July 23, 2004

Notable people from Tamano
Yukari Ichijo, manga artist
Hisaichi Ishii, manga artist
Ukita Kōkichi, aviation pioneer
Taiyo Sugiura, actor
Tetsuo Takashima, author
Katsuya Terada, artist
Hiroshi Yagi, baseball player

References

External links 

  

Cities in Okayama Prefecture
Tamano, Okayama
Populated coastal places in Japan
Port settlements in Japan